The End Band is an Alternative, Indie pop band from Vienna (Wien), Austria, which was founded in 2009 and soon became a well-known act in the Viennese independent scene.

Their first EP Let My Words Protect You was released in December 2010 and was highly regarded by local newspapers like Falter and featured by the major national ORF radio station FM4, which appointed The End Band to "Band of Month of March 2011" and placed their songs in rotation.

In February 2013 The End Band released their debut-album Babysounds on ZITA Records, it was produced by Alexander Wieser, frontman of Deckchair Orange. The record was put out as limited edition on vinyl and as digital version and was again appreciated by the media, like FM4, German music-blog Rote Raupe or biggest Austrian newspaper Kronen Zeitung.
The album single Fury came up to position 12 in the Austrian Indie Charts.

Discography

Studio Works
Let My Words Protect You EP (2010)
Babysounds LP (2013)

Music videos
 Ablepsia (March 2012)
 Fury (January 2013)

References

External links 
 The End Band official site

Austrian pop music groups
Musical groups established in 2009
Musical quintets